The 1947 Vanderbilt Commodores football team was an American football team that represented Vanderbilt University in the Southeastern Conference (SEC) during the 1947 college football season. In its fifth season under head coach Red Sanders, the team compiled a 6–4 record (3–3 against SEC opponents), tied for fourth place in the SEC, and outscored all opponents by a total of 182 to 85.

Schedule

References

Vanderbilt
Vanderbilt Commodores football seasons
Vanderbilt Commodores football